The year 1957 in television involved some significant events. Below is a list of television-related events during 1957.



Events
 January 6 – Elvis Presley makes his final appearance on The Ed Sullivan Show.
 January 25 – Steve Allen makes his final appearance as host of NBC's The Tonight Show. He is replaced by Jack Lescoulie and the show is changed from a talk/variety show format to be more like the series Today, with the title Tonight! America After Dark.
 February 16 – In the United Kingdom, the "Toddlers' Truce" (an arrangement whereby there have been no TV broadcasts between 6 PM and 7 PM, to allow parents to put their children to bed) is abolished. It has been a major obstacle to the success of ITV.
 March 7 – Portugal begins the Rádio e Televisão de Portugal television service after several months of experimentation.
 March 31 – The first TV version of Cinderella, starring 21-year-old Julie Andrews, and with songs by Richard Rodgers and Oscar Hammerstein II, is broadcast in color by CBS.
 April 1
 In Britain, the BBC's Panorama current affairs television programme presented by Richard Dimbleby broadcasts a spaghetti tree hoax report purporting to show spaghetti being harvested in Switzerland, believed to be the first April Fool's Day joke televised.
 In the United States WYES begins broadcasting on channel 8 in New Orleans. WYES will swap channels with WVUE in 1970.
April 4 – Desilu films "The Ricardos Dedicate a Statue", the 180th and final first run episode of I Love Lucy. Its May 6 broadcast marks the end of an era in early  television comedy. 
 April 24 – First broadcast of BBC Television astronomy series The Sky at Night in the United Kingdom presented by Patrick Moore. This will be broadcast with the same presenter until his death in December 2012.
 May 29 – In Hong Kong, Rediffusion Television, a predecessor of ATV Home and RTHK TV 31, begins broadcasting as a bilingual subscription cable service, becoming the first television station in a Crown colony of the British Empire as well as the first station in a predominantly Chinese city.  
 June – On Tonight! America After Dark, Jack Lescoulie is unsuccessful, so NBC hires Al "Jazzbo" Collins as master of ceremonies. Collins doesn't last long; NBC is already planning to replace him and restore the original format as The Tonight Show.
 June 24 – Front Page Challenge, television's longest continuously running panel show, starts broadcasting on the Canadian Broadcasting Corporation network. It runs for 38 years.
 July 29 – Jack Paar becomes the permanent host for NBC's The Tonight Show. The format reverts to a talk/variety show.
 August 5 – American Bandstand begins its 30-year syndicated run on US network television.
 August 31 – Central Scotland's independent channel Scottish Television goes on air, the first 7-day-a-week ITV franchise to do so.
 September 7 – In the United States:
 NBC introduces an animated version of its "living color" peacock logo.
 WWL-TV Channel 4 signs on as New Orleans' CBS affiliate.
November 26 – WHDH-TV/5-Boston begins broadcasting. It soon becomes involved in controversy about its license. It finally loses its license in 1972.
 December 25 – The British Royal Christmas Message is televised with the Queen (Elizabeth II) on camera for the first time.
 When Nat King Cole's television series is unable to get a sponsor, Frankie Laine is the first artist to cross TV's color line, foregoing his usual salary of $10,000.00 to become the first white artist to appear as a guest. Other major performers follow suit, including Mel Tormé and Tony Bennett, but, despite an increase in ratings, the show still fails to acquire a national sponsor.
 Gorni Kramer makes his first appearance on Italian television, in the program Il Musichiere.
 Cyprus begins a limited television service, serving only three hours a day, twice-weekly. By 1960 a full service will be initiated.
 CBC Television begins nationwide broadcasting of NHL games as Canada's microwave network is completed coast-to-coast. Prior to this, broadcasts had been delayed.
 Westinghouse introduces the first rectangular tube color TV. Due to issues with convergence (aligning the guns to get a single image), the sets are withdrawn from the market. The first successful rectangular color tubes are sold during the mid-1960s.
 Hollywood takes over New York as the dominant for prime time TV programs, upgrading most of the TV genre, changing from live broadcasts to filmed series.

Programs/programmes

Series on the air in 1957
Gillette Cavalcade of Sports (1946–1960)
Howdy Doody (1947–1960)
Kraft Television Theater (1947–1958)
Meet the Press (1947–present)
Candid Camera (1948–present)
The Ed Sullivan Show (1948–1971)
The Perry Como Show (1948–1963)
Come Dancing (UK) (1949–1995)
The Voice of Firestone (1949–1963)
The George Burns and Gracie Allen Show (1950–1958)
The Jack Benny Program (1950–1965)
Truth or Consequences (1950–1988)
What's My Line (1950–1967)
Your Hit Parade (1950–1959)
Dragnet (1951–1959)
I Love Lucy (1951–1957)
The Tonight Show (1954–present)
Hallmark Hall of Fame (1951–present)
Love of Life (1951–1980)
Search for Tomorrow (1951–1986)
Sergeant Preston of the Yukon (1955-1958)
American Bandstand (1952–1989)
The Adventures of Ozzie and Harriet (1952–1966)
Adventures of Superman (1952–1958)
The Guiding Light (1952–2009)
Today (1952–present)
This Is Your Life (US) (1952–1961)
The Danny Thomas Show (1953-1964)
Panorama (UK) (1953–present)
The Good Old Days (UK) (1953–1983)
Climax! (1954–1958)
Disneyland (1954–1958)
Face the Nation (1954–present)
Father Knows Best (1954-1960)
The Brighter Day (1954–1962)
The Milton Berle Show (1954–1967)
The Secret Storm (1954–1974)
The Tonight Show (1954–present)
Zoo Quest (UK) (1954–1964)
Alfred Hitchcock Presents (1955–1962)
Captain Kangaroo (1955–1984)
Cheyenne (1955–1962)
Country Music Jubilee (1955–1960)
Dixon of Dock Green (UK) (1955–1976)
Gunsmoke (1955–1975)
Mickey Mouse Club (1955–1959)
The Lawrence Welk Show (1955–1982)
This Is Your Life (UK) (1955–2003)
Armchair Theatre (UK) (1956–1968)
As the World Turns (1956–2010)
The Ford Show, Starring Tennessee Ernie Ford (1956–1961)
Hancock's Half Hour (1956–1962)
Opportunity Knocks (UK) (1956–1978)
The Edge of Night (1956–1984)
The Gale Storm Show, Oh! Susanna (1956–1960)
The Price Is Right (1956–1965)
The Steve Allen Show (1956–1960)
What the Papers Say (UK) (1956–2008)
Bachelor Father (1957-1962)
The Real McCoys (1957-1963)

Debuts
January 4 – Mr. Adams and Eve on CBS (1957–1958)
April 24 – The Sky at Night (UK) presented by Patrick Moore (1957–present)
May 1 – Junior Television Club 
May 7 – In Melbourne Tonight with Graham Kennedy on GTV-9
June 19 – The Army Game (UK) on Britain's ITV (1957–1961)
June 24 – Front Page Challenge (1957–1995)
July – Tivoli Party Time (1957) on HSV-7 (Melbourne, Australia)
August 15 – Australia's Amateur Hour (1957–1958) on TCN-9 and HSV-7
September 14 - Have Gun - Will Travel (1957-1963)
September 15 - Sally on NBC, first filmed series by Paramount Television (1957-1958)
September 18 – Wagon Train (1957–1965)
September 21 – Perry Mason on CBS (1957–1966), The Polly Bergen Show on NBC
September 22 – Maverick on ABC (1957–1961)
October 2 – Educated Evans (UK) on BBC (1957–1958)
October 3
The Pat Boone Chevy Showroom on ABC (1957–1960)
The Real McCoys on ABC (1957–1962), then CBS (1962-1963)
October 4 – Leave It to Beaver (1957–1963)
October 10 – Zorro on ABC (1957–1959)
October 13 – The Edsel Show, first full-length show to be recorded on videotape, first of many Bing Crosby specials
November 6 – The Lucy–Desi Comedy Hour on CBS (1957–1960)
November 17 – Scotland Yard on the (American network) ABC (1957–1958)
November – Swallow's Juniors (1957–1970) on HSV-7 (Melbourne, Australia)
December 14 - Hanna-Barbera's First Series, The Ruff and Reddy Show on NBC (1957-1960)
December 25 – Royal Christmas Message first televised with a message from Elizabeth II
Astor Showcase (1957–1959) on ATN-7 (Sydney, Australia)
Divorce Court (US) (1957–1969, 1985–1992, 1999–present)
 The Gumby Show (1957–1968) on NBC

Ending this year

Births

Television Debuts
Ed Asner − Studio One
James Coburn – Studio One in Hollywood
Peter Falk – Robert Montgomery Presents
Robert Forster – Wagon Train
Katharine Ross – Omnibus
Dean Stockwell – Wagon Train

References